Andrew Powell may refer to:

 Andrew Powell (born 1949), music composer, performer, arranger and producer, a Henry Cow member
 Andrew Powell (politician) (born 1973), Australian politician
 Andy Powell (born 1950), guitarist and songwriter, an original Wishbone Ash member
 Andy Powell (rugby), Wales international rugby player